Apistoloricaria ommation is a species of armored catfish endemic to Peru where it is found in the lower Marañon River.  This species grows to a length of  SL.

References
 

Loricariini
Fish of South America
Freshwater fish of Peru
Taxa named by Isaäc J. H. Isbrücker
Taxa named by Han Nijssen
Fish described in 1988